Dickens is a city in and the county seat of Dickens County, Texas, United States. The population was 286 at the 2010 census, down from 332 at the 2000 census.

Charles Weldon Cannon (1915–1997), a Dickens County native, made his famous boots and saddles in Dickens.

Geography

Dickens is located west of the center of Dickens County at  (33.621341, –100.834987), with the Croton Breaks to the east and Mackenzie Peak to the north. U.S. Route 82 passes through Dickens, leading east  to Guthrie and west  to Lubbock. Texas State Highway 70 crosses the west side of town, leading north  to Matador and southeast  to Jayton.

Demographics

2020 census

As of the 2020 United States census, there were 219 people, 126 households, and 62 families residing in the city.

2000 census
As of the census of 2000, there were 332 people, 133 households, and 88 families living in the city. The population density was 340.1 people per square mile (130.8/km2). There were 163 housing units at an average density of 167.0/sq mi (64.2/km2). The racial makeup of the city was 94.58% White, 4.52% from other races, and 0.90% from two or more races. Hispanic or Latino of any race were 9.04% of the population.

There were 133 households, out of which 27.8% had children under the age of 18 living with them, 56.4% were married couples living together, 6.0% had a female householder with no husband present, and 33.1% were non-families. 29.3% of all households were made up of individuals, and 15.0% had someone living alone who was 65 years of age or older. The average household size was 2.47 and the average family size was 3.08.

In the city, the population was spread out, with 25.9% under the age of 18, 6.0% from 18 to 24, 24.1% from 25 to 44, 25.3% from 45 to 64, and 18.7% who were 65 years of age or older. The median age was 39 years. For every 100 females, there were 100.0 males. For every 100 females age 18 and over, there were 98.4 males.

The median income for a household in the city was $19,875, and the median income for a family was $31,750. Males had a median income of $22,361 versus $18,750 for females. The per capita income for the city was $13,024. About 15.5% of families and 20.6% of the population were below the poverty line, including 16.3% of those under age 18 and 21.9% of those age 65 or over.

Education
Dickens is served by the Spur and Patton Springs Independent School Districts.

Climate
According to the Köppen climate classification, Dickens has a semiarid climate, BSk on climate maps.

References

Cities in Texas
Cities in Dickens County, Texas
County seats in Texas